The Kyrgyz Ala-Too also known as Kyrgyz Alatau, Kyrgyz Range, and Alexander Range (until 1933) is a large range in the North Tien-Shan. It stretches for a total length of 454 km from the west-end of Issyk-Kul to the town Taraz in Kazakhstan. It runs in the east–west direction, separating Chüy Valley from Kochkor Valley, Suusamyr Valley, and Talas Valley. Talas Ala-Too Range adjoins the Kyrgyz Ala-Too in vicinity of Töö Ashuu Pass. The western part of Kyrgyz Ala-Too serves as a natural border between Kyrgyzstan and Kazakhstan.

Parts of the range are contained within Ala Archa National Park, a popular alpine recreation area.

Notable peaks
 Semenov-Tian-Shansky Peak (4895m)
 Korona Peak (4860m)
 Free Korea Peak (4740m)
 Vladimir Putin Peak (4446m)

See also
Ysyk-Ata Resort

References

Mountain ranges of Kyrgyzstan
Mountain ranges of Kazakhstan
Tian Shan
Mountain ranges of the Tian Shan